Augustine Williams may refer to:

Augustine Podmore Williams (1852–1916), English mariner
Gus Williams (pitcher) (1870–1890), American baseball player
 Augustine Williams (footballer) (born 1997), Sierra Leonean footballer

See also
August Williams (disambiguation)
Gus Williams (disambiguation)